The northern pudu (Pudu mephistophiles, Mapudungun püdü or püdu) is a species of South American deer native to the Andes of Colombia, Venezuela, Peru and Ecuador. It is the world's smallest deer and is classified as Data Deficient in the IUCN Red List.

Description
Its coat tends to be lighter than that of the southern pudu, but the face is darker compared to the coat.

Range and habitat
It has a discontinuous range across the Andes of Colombia, Ecuador, and Peru. It inhabits montane forests, high-elevation elfin forests, and humid alpine páramo grasslands above the tree-line. The Marañón dry forests are a gap in the species' range, separating the Ecuadorian population from the Peruvian population in the Peruvian Yungas south of the Marañón River.

References

Capreolinae
Mammals of Colombia
Mammals of Ecuador
Mammals of Peru
Mammals of Venezuela
Taxa named by William Edward de Winton
Mammals described in 1896
Fauna of the northwestern Andean montane forests
Fauna of the Andes